Paul Kornfeld may refer to:

Paul Kornfeld (playwright) (1889–1942), Prague-born German-language Jewish expressionist
Paul Kornfeld (swimmer) (born 1987), American college champion in 2006–08